Puddle is a puzzle-platform game developed by Neko Entertainment and published by Konami for PlayStation Vita, PlayStation 3, PlayStation 4 and Xbox 360. The game was also self-published by Neko Entertainment for Wii U, and for the PC through Steam, GOG.com, and Desura. The game cost around 6.99£ on steam and other platforms.

Gameplay
In the game, the player must guide a puddle of fluid to its target destination by tilting the scene, not by moving the fluid itself, similar to Nintendo's WiiWare game Fluidity. They must work with physics: friction, momentum, and the unique properties of each type of fluid and environment to send as much of each puddle past such obstacles as fires, rifts, spills and others, through environments like pipes, plants, laboratories, a human body, a sewer, a rocket, a foundry and a power station. The experience is physics based, making the fluid motion realistic. The game allows the players to be a liquid like Nitroglycerin, and they need to guide it to a certain point. Nitroglycerin tends to explode, so the players must learn to carefully guide it. The game has 49 levels, 2 difficulties (extreme and normal), leaderboards and medals.

Development
The game was first presented at the Independent Gaming Festival at GDC 2010, winning a Student Showcase prize.

Reception

Puddle received generally positive reviews from game critics. Rick Lane of PC Gamer gave the game an 80/100 score.

References

External links
 Puddle at Konami Digital Entertainment website

2012 video games
Xbox 360 Live Arcade games
PlayStation 3 games
PlayStation 4 games
PlayStation Network games
PlayStation Vita games
Puzzle-platform games
Video games developed in France
Wii U eShop games
Windows games
Android (operating system) games
Neko Entertainment games
MacOS games
Linux games
Single-player video games
Playdigious games